Jayaraj or Jeyaraj (' ) is a South Indian male given name. Due to the South Indian tradition of using patronymic surnames it may also be a surname for males and females. The name literally translates to "king of victory / victory king".

Notable people

Given name
 Jayaraj (born 1960), Indian filmmaker
 Jeyaraj Fernandopulle (1953–2008), Sri Lankan politician
 E. P. Jayarajan, Indian politician
 M. P. Jayaraj (1946–1989), Indian criminal
 M. V. Jayarajan, Indian politician
 P. Jayarajan, Indian politician
Jayaraj Warrier, Indian (Malayalam) stand-up comedian

Surname
 Ajitha Jayarajan, Indian politician
 Harris Jayaraj (born 1975), Indian composer

See also
 Jayarajadevi
 
 

Tamil masculine given names